Mt. Healthy Jr/Sr High School is a public middle and high school in Mount Healthy, Ohio, United States. It is part of the Mount Healthy City Schools district.

Notable alumni 
 Joel Heath, NFL player
 David Montgomery, NFL player
 Diyral Briggs, NFL player
 Bill Doran, MLB player

References

External links 
 

High schools in Hamilton County, Ohio
Public middle schools in Ohio
Public high schools in Ohio